Event One of the 2016 Monster Energy FIM Speedway World Cup was the opening race of the 2016 edition of the Speedway World Cup. It was staged on 23 July 2016 at Vojens Speedway Center in Vojens, Denmark and was won by Poland from hosts Denmark, Russia, and the Czech Republic. As a result, Poland progressed directly to the 2016 Speedway World Cup Final, while Denmark and Russia progressed to the 2016 Speedway World Cup Race-off. The Czech Republic were eliminated.

Piotr Pawlicki Jr. led Poland to the final by scoring 12 points, while Patryk Dudek, who scored 11 points, secured second place in the heat 20 to ensure Poland finished ahead of Denmark. Michael Jepsen Jensen top scored for the Danes with 18 points, while Emil Sayfutdinov was the star of the meeting, scoring 18 points for Russia.

Results

Scores

See also
 2016 Speedway Grand Prix

References

2016 Speedway World Cup